Bengal Chemical (or Wow Momo Bengal Chemical for sponsorship reason) is a station of Kolkata Metro. It is on Line 2 or the East-West Metro. It serves the Duttabad, Kankurgachi and Kadapara area. The structure is situated over EM Bypass, in front of Mani Square.

The Station

Layout

Connections

Auto

Bus 
Bus route number DN16/1, JM2, 007, C14/1, S4, S21, S37, S37A, AC30S, AC37, AC50, AC50A, V1 etc. serve the station.

Air 
Netaji Subhash Chandra Bose International Airport is 9 km via VIP Road.

Entry/Exits

References 

Kolkata Metro stations
Railway stations in Kolkata